1852–1860 M. l'abbé Louis-Jacques Casault 
 1860–1866 M. l'abbé Elzéar-Alexandre Taschereau 
 1866–1869 Mgr Michel-Édouard Méthot 
 1869–1871 M. l'abbé Elzéar-Alexandre Taschereau 
 1871–1880 Mgr Thomas-Étienne Hamel 
 1880–1883 Mgr Michel-Édouard Méthot 
 1883–1886 Mgr Thomas-Étienne Hamel 
 1886–1887 Mgr Michel-Édouard Méthot 
 1887–1893 Mgr Benjamin Pâquet 
 1893–1899 Mgr Joseph-Clovis-Kemner Laflamme 
 1899–1908 Mgr Olivier-E. Mathieu 
 1908–1909 Mgr Joseph-Clovis-Kemner Laflamme 
 1909–1915 Mgr Amédée-Edmond Gosselin 
 1915–1921 Mgr François Pelletier 
 1921 M. l'abbé Pierre Hébert 
 1921–1924 Mgr Charles-Napoléon Gariépy 
 1924–1927 Mgr Camille Roy 
 1927–1929 Mgr Amédée-Edmond Gosselin 
 1929 Mgr Camille Roy 
 1929–1932 Mgr Philéas-J. Filion 
 1932–1938 Mgr Camille Roy 
 1938–1939 Mgr Arthur Robert
 1939–1940 Mgr Alexandre Vachon 
 1940–1943 Mgr Camille Roy 
 1943–1945 Mgr Cyrille Gagnon 
 1945–1954 Mgr Ferdinand Vandry 
 1954–1960 Mgr Alphonse-Marie Parent 
 1960–1972 Mgr Louis-Albert Vachon 
 1972–1977 Larkin Kerwin 
 1977–1987 Jean-Guy Paquet 
 1987–1997 Michel Gervais 
 1997–2002 François Tavenas 
 2002–2007 Michel Pigeon 
 2007–2017 Denis Brière
 2017–present Sophie D'Amours

See also 
 Université Laval

Université Laval
Rectors of Université Laval
Laval University, Rectors of
Rectors of Universite Laval
Laval University